Dr. James Merryman House is T-plan historic farmhouse with Italianate features in Hilliard, Ohio. In Hilliard, it is the only house of its type and was built in 1879 for local doctor, James M. Merryman.

Dr. Merryman was a Civil War veteran who was incarcerated in the Andersonville Confederate prison. He later served on Ohio's 82nd General Assembly.

It was added to the National Register of Historic Places on May 26, 1988.

References 

Italianate architecture in Ohio
National Register of Historic Places in Franklin County, Ohio
Historic houses
Houses on the National Register of Historic Places in Ohio
Houses completed in 1879